Oleksandr Viktorovych Horshkov (also rendered as Aleksandr Gorshkov, ; born 8 February 1970) is a Ukrainian association football coach and former midfielder.

Career

International career
He played for Ukraine in UEFA Euro 2004 qualifying. Before played for Ukraine, he played twice for Russia in friendlies.

Coaching career
After his retirement he became a coach for the Zenit youth team. He managed FC Saturn Ramenskoye.

Honours
 As a player
 1999 – Russian Cup
 2001 – Russian Premier League bronze.
 2007 Russian Premier League
 2008 Russian Super Cup
 2008 UEFA cup
 2008 UEFA Super Cup
 As a coach
 2009 – Russian Youth Team Championship (as assistant coach)

Personal
Oleksandr is married and has 2 children.

References

External links
Player profile at the official Zenit website

1970 births
Living people
People from Kirovsk, Luhansk Oblast
Russian footballers
Russian football managers
Russia international footballers
Ukrainian footballers
Ukraine international footballers
Ukrainian expatriate footballers
Ukrainian football managers
Expatriate footballers in Russia
FC Shakhtar Stakhanov players
SKA Kiev players
FC Chornomorets Odesa players
FC Nyva Vinnytsia players
FC Zhemchuzhina Sochi players
FC Zenit Saint Petersburg players
UEFA Cup winning players
FC Saturn Ramenskoye players
Association football midfielders
Russian Premier League players
Ukrainian Premier League players
Dual internationalists (football)
Russian people of Ukrainian descent
FC Baltika Kaliningrad managers
FC Nizhny Novgorod managers
FC Saturn Ramenskoye managers
FC Zenit Saint Petersburg non-playing staff
Expatriate football managers in Latvia
Russian expatriate football managers
Ukrainian expatriate football managers
Sportspeople from Luhansk Oblast